A Friendship Store is a state-run store in the People's Republic of China (PRC), which initially sold exclusively to foreign visitors and tourists, diplomats, and government officials, but now has no restrictions on customers.

History
The stores were state-owned and first appeared in the 1950s, when they were primarily frequented by the many Soviet experts assisting China's economic development. The stores sold Western, imported items, such as peanut butter and Hershey bars, as well as high-quality Chinese art and crafts. Prices were considerably higher than those in the country of origin but, because the stores operated as a monopoly for imported items, buyers had no other choice. The old Friendship Stores accepted only foreign exchange certificates as currency. Items for sale included uncensored copies of Western literature such as The New York Times, so customers had to present a foreign passport to the guards to be permitted entry. Often crowds of people would look through the windows to see what was for sale. 

The abolition of foreign exchange certificates in the early 1990s made Friendship Stores largely redundant, with foreign visitors being allowed to hold ordinary renminbi in the PRC. Most stores have now closed, but a few remain, most notably in Beijing, Shanghai, and Guangzhou.

Modern Friendship Stores
The Beijing store has a Starbucks, Baskin-Robbins, Délifrance, Pizza Hut, and a bookshop which stocks a wide range of English-language magazines and newspapers. It has been announced that the site is to be redeveloped, with the Friendship Store being replaced by a more modern shopping center, offices, and a Conrad Hotel.

There are also two Friendship Stores in Shanghai, one in the city center and one in Hongqiao.

The Friendship Store in Guangzhou has developed into a listed company. Apart from the original store opposite the Garden Hotel, it now has five branch stores in Guangzhou, Foshan and Nanning.

See also
Politics of the People's Republic of China
Dollar store (Cuba)
Intershop

External links
nytimes travel
frommers Shanghai
frommers Beijing

Hard currency shops in socialist countries
Economic history of the People's Republic of China